The Potagannissing River (Anishinaabe: Bootaagan-minising-ziibi (syncope as Bootaagan-mnising-ziibi), meaning "River on the Mill Island (Drummond Island)") is an  river in Michigan, located on Drummond Island in Lake Huron.

See also
List of rivers of Michigan

References

Rivers of Michigan
Rivers of Chippewa County, Michigan
Tributaries of Lake Huron